IBSYS is the discontinued tape-based operating system that IBM supplied with its IBM 709, IBM 7090 and IBM 7094 computers. A similar operating system (but with several significant differences), also called IBSYS, was provided with IBM 7040 and IBM 7044 computers. IBSYS was based on FORTRAN Monitor System (FMS) and (more likely) Bell Labs' "BESYS" rather than the  SHARE Operating System.
IBSYS directly supported several old language processors on the $EXECUTE card: 9PAC, FORTRAN and IBSFAP. Newer language processors ran under IBJOB. 

IBM later provided similar facilities for the 7040/7044 as IBM 7040/7044 Operating System (16K/32K) 7040-PR-150 and for the IBM 1410/IBM 7010 as IBM 1410/7010 Operating System 1410-PR-155.

IBSYS System Supervisor

IBSYS itself is a resident monitor program, that reads control card images placed between the decks of program and data cards of individual jobs. An IBSYS control card begins with a "$" in column 1, immediately followed by a Control Name that selects the various IBSYS utility programs needed to set up and run the job. These card deck images are usually read from magnetic tapes prepared offline, not directly from the card reader.

IBJOB Processor
The IBJOB Processor is a subsystem that runs under the IBSYS System Supervisor. It reads control cards that request, e.g., compilation, execution. The languages supported include COBOL. Commercial Translator (COMTRAN), Fortran IV (IBFTC) and Macro Assembly Program (IBMAP).

See also
 University of Michigan Executive System
 Timeline of operating systems

Further reading
 Noble, A. S., Jr., "Design of an integrated programming and operating system", IBM Systems Journal, June 1963. "The present paper considers the underlying design concepts of IBSYS/IBJOB, an integrated programming and operating system. The historical background and over-all structure of the system are discussed. Flow of jobs through the IBJOB processor, as controlled by the monitor, is also described."
 "IBM 7090/7094 IBSYS Operating System Version 13 System Monitor (IBSYS)", Form C28-6248-7
 "IBM 7090/7094 IBSYS Operating System Version 13 IBJOB Processor", Form C28-6389-1
 "IBM 7090/7094 IBSYS Operating System Version 13 IBJOB Processor Debugging Package", Form C28-6393-2

Notes

External links
 IBM 7090/94 IBSYS Operating System, Jack Harper
 Dave Pitts' IBM 7090 support
 IBSYS source archived with Bitsavers
 History of FORTRAN and FORTRAN II  – FORTRAN II and other software running on IBSYS, Software Preservation Group, Computer History Museum

7090 94 IBSYS
OS IBSYS
Discontinued operating systems
1960 software